Minuscule 754 (in the Gregory-Aland numbering), A142 (von Soden), is a Greek minuscule manuscript of the New Testament written on parchment. Palaeographically it has been assigned to the 11th century. The manuscript has no complex contents. Scrivener labelled it as 763e.

Description 
The codex contains the text of the four Gospels, on 464 parchment leaves (size ), with some lacunae (Matthew 6:25-8:19; John 21:18-25). The texts of Matthew 6:25-8:19; John 21:18-25 were supplied by a later hand on paper.

The biblical text is surrounded by a catena.

The text is divided according to the Ammonian Sections, with a references to the Eusebian Canons.

It contains Epistula ad Carpianum, lectionary markings at the margin, and a commentary. The manuscript is ornamented.

Text
The Greek text of the codex is a representative of the Byzantine text-type. Aland placed it in Category V.

It was not examined by using the Claremont Profile Method.

In John 2:22 it reads ελεγε αυτοις along with Codex Cyprius, Codex Petropolitanus, 1212, lectionary 1076; majority reads ελεγε;

History 
Scrivener and Gregory dated the manuscript to the 11th century. The manuscript is currently dated by the INTF to the 11th century.

The manuscript was brought from Janina.

It was added to the list of New Testament manuscripts by Scrivener (763) and Gregory (754).

The manuscript is now housed at the Bibliothèque nationale de France (Suppl. Gr. 1076) in Paris.

See also

 List of New Testament minuscules
 Biblical manuscript
 Textual criticism
 Minuscule 753

References

Further reading
 

Greek New Testament minuscules
11th-century biblical manuscripts
Bibliothèque nationale de France collections